Malons-et-Elze is a commune in the Gard department in southern France.

Geography
The commune is traversed by the river Chassezac.

Population

See also
Communes of the Gard department

References

Communes of Gard